Tscheu La Ling (Chinese: 林球立; pinyin: Lín Qiú Lì; born 6 January 1956) is a Dutch former professional footballer of mixed Dutch and Chinese descent, who played for clubs in the Netherlands, Greece and France. His name has been spelled in various ways throughout his career, but usually as Tscheu La Ling; he was generally uninterested in how it was spelled but revealed in a February 2007 interview that his name was officially Ling Tshen La. This name uses Chinese naming customs. The family name is Ling. In June 2015 he was appointed to the advisory board of Ajax Amsterdam. He is also the owner of the Slovak football club AS Trenčín. 

He currently is the creator and owner of Fitshape, which sells professional sport supplementation for athletes.

Club career
Born in The Hague to a Chinese father and a Dutch mother, Ling began his career with his hometown team Den Haag in the 1973-74 and 1974-75 seasons. He joined Ajax in the 1975-76 season. Ajax won the Eredivisie title in the 4 seasons of 1976-77, 1978-79, 1979-80, and 1981-82, and reached 4 Dutch Cup finals in the 4 consecutive seasons of 1977-78, 1978-79, 1979-80, and 1980-81, but these feats paled in comparison to the European successes during the early 1970s, when Ajax, with players like Johan Cruijff, Johan Neeskens, Johnny Rep, Ruud Krol, Barry Hulshoff, Horst Blankenburg, Arie Haan, Gerrie Mühren, and Piet Keizer won 3 European Cups in the 1970-71, 1971-72, and 1972-73 seasons. Only in 1979-80 was Ajax able to reach a European Cup semi-final. Ling played together with players like Krol, Ruud Geels, Frank Arnesen, Soren Lerby, Simon Tahamata, and Martin van Geel, and later also with Wim Kieft, Frank Rijkaard, Gerald Vanenburg, Jesper Olsen, and Sonny Silooy. In December 1981, Cruijff returned to Ajax. The team was built around him, and Ling lost his place in the starting line-up to Vanenburg. He moved to Panathinaikos in July 1982, and then Marseille in July 1984. He spent a year with Ajax's bitter rival Feyenoord for the 1985-86 season, and moved back to Den Haag for the 1986-87 season before retiring at the end of the season.

International career
Ling played for the Dutch team during qualifying for UEFA Euro 1980. He earned 14 caps for the Netherlands and scored 2 goals from 1977 to 1982.

Honours
Ajax
Eredivisie: 1976–77, 1978–79, 1979–80, 1981–82
KNVB Cup: 1978–79, 1981–82

Panathinaikos
Alpha Ethniki: 1983–84
Greek Football Cup: 1983–84

References

External links

 
 
 degoeieouwetijd.nl
 om-passion.com

1956 births
Living people
Footballers from The Hague
Dutch people of Chinese descent
Association football wingers
Dutch footballers
Netherlands international footballers
Dutch expatriate footballers
Dutch expatriate sportspeople in Greece
Expatriate footballers in Greece
Dutch expatriate sportspeople in France
Expatriate footballers in France
ADO Den Haag players
AFC Ajax players
Panathinaikos F.C. players
Olympique de Marseille players
Feyenoord players
Eredivisie players
Ligue 1 players
Super League Greece players
Dutch expatriate sportspeople in Slovakia